Pjetër Losha was an Albanian clan leader in medieval Epirus. He belonged to the Losha fis (clan or tribe) and was the leader of a combined force of his own clan and the fis of Mazaraki and Malakasi. In 1360, he became Despot of Arta, Rogoi and the area of Amphilochia. He died in 1374 and was succeeded by his close ally, John Spata. The Chronicle of the Tocco is an important primary source for his life and the Albanians in medieval Epirus in general.

Life

Losha's genealogy or birth date is unknown. He belonged to the Losha clan. The word lios means "pockmark" in Albanian. He was part of the Albanian attacks in the remnants of Byzantine Epirus. In 1358–59, Albanian clans overran the regional feudal rulers and established themselves under John Spata and Peter Losha. He had a son named Gjin. Losha led the Albanian force against Nikephoros II Orsini at the Battle of Achelous that won him the rule of Arta; he founded his domain around Arta with the help of the Mazaraki and Malakasi clans. The domains he gained after the battle also included Rogoi and Amphilochia, as mentioned in the Chronicle of Ioannina. In 1360, Simeon Uroš, the titular Serbian Emperor, in an attempt to avoid conflict with the Albanians and as an acknowledgment of their military strength decided to the leave the areas of Arta and Aetolia to Shpata and Losha.

In 1366, Toma Preljubović succeeded Simeon as ruler of Epirus. His rule marked a renewal of hostilities in the region as from 1367 to 1370, Ioannina, the capital of Preljubović, came under constant siege and was blocked by the Mazaraki and Malakasi clans under Losha. A truce was signed when Peter's son John was betrothed to Thomas's daughter Irina. She died in the 1375 plague that affected the region and hostilities began again.

Possessions
His estates included the Epirote cities of:

Arta, 
Rogoi or Roga (modern Filippiada) 
Amphilochia

Family
He had a son named Gjin, who married Irina Preljubović, the daughter of Thoma.

References

Sources
 

 
 
 
 
 
 

1374 deaths
14th-century Albanian people
Despots of Arta
People of the Serbian Empire
Medieval Albanian nobility
Year of birth unknown